The 2020 Nebraska Cornhuskers football team represented the University of Nebraska in the 2020 NCAA Division I FBS football season. The team was coached by third-year head coach Scott Frost and played their games at Memorial Stadium in Lincoln, Nebraska, as members of the West Division in the Big Ten Conference.

On August 11, 2020, the Big Ten Conference suspended all fall sports competitions due to the COVID-19 pandemic. The team disclosed an attempt to play a fall football season as an independent, but Commissioner Kevin Warren stated they could not do so without facing consequences. In late-August, a group of Nebraska players also sued the Big Ten, alleging that its council did not actually vote on the postponement. On September 16, the Big Ten reinstated the season, announcing an eight-game season beginning on October 24.

After playing to a 3–5 record, all in conference games, the team announced on December 20 that it would not participate in any bowl game.

Previous season
The Cornhuskers finished the 2019 season with a 5–7 and 3–6 record and finished in fifth place for the second year in a row in the Big Ten West Division. Nebraska did not attend a bowl for the third year in a row.

Offseason

2020 NFL Draft

Transfers

Outgoing

Incoming

Recruits
The Cornhuskers signed a total of 23 scholarship recruits and 20 walk-ons during the Early Signing Period on December 18, 2019.

Scholarship recruits

Walk-on recruits

Preseason

Award watch lists

Preseason media polls
Below are the results of the media poll with total points received next to each school and first-place votes in parentheses. For the 2020 poll, Ohio State was voted as the favorite to win both the East Division and the Big Ten Championship Game. This is the 10th iteration of the preseason media poll conducted by Cleveland.com, which polls at least one credentialed media member for each Big Ten team. Only twice in the last ten years has the media accurately predicted the Big Ten champion.

Schedule
Nebraska had games scheduled against Central Michigan, South Dakota State, and Cincinnati, but canceled these games on July 9 due to the Big Ten Conference's decision to play a conference-only schedule due to the COVID-19 pandemic.

On September 19, the Big Ten announced a new league schedule to accommodate a new 9-game conference-only season, where the ninth game will feature cross divisional matchups of #1 vs #1, #2 vs. #2, etc.

On October 29, Nebraska attempted to replace the Wisconsin game with a game against FCS school Chattanooga. However, it was denied by the Big Ten Conference, which reaffirmed its policy against scheduling nonconference games for the 2020 season.

Nebraska's game with Wisconsin was canceled due to a COVID-19 outbreak at Wisconsin. The game will not be rescheduled. Instead, both teams will have a bye and will have just seven games.

Nebraska's game with Rutgers has been adjusted from a 3:00 PM to a 6:30 PM kickoff time on Friday, December 18 after the cancellation of the Indiana-Purdue game.

Roster and coaching staff

Depth chart

Game summaries

at No. 5 Ohio State

vs Wisconsin

The Wisconsin at Nebraska game was canceled due to a COVID-19 outbreak at Wisconsin. The game will not be rescheduled. Instead, both teams will have a bye and will have just seven games.

at Northwestern

vs Penn State

vs Illinois

at No. 24 Iowa

at Purdue

vs Minnesota

at Rutgers

Big Ten Awards

All-Conference Awards

2020 Big Ten Offense All-Conference Teams and Awards

Rankings

Players drafted into the NFL

References

Nebraska
Nebraska Cornhuskers football seasons
Nebraska Cornhuskers football